Green tea is tea is made from the leaves of Camellia sinensis

Green Tea may also refer to:

 Green Tea (film), a 2003 Chinese film
 Green Tea (radio show), a program on RTÉ Radio 1
 Green Tea and Other Ghost Stories, a 1945 collection of short stories
 Tomohiro Tatejima, a Japanese Tetris player